Sindhi pulao is a type of rice pilaf, prepared with mutton, beef, or chicken. It is prepared by Sindhi people in their marriage ceremonies, condolence meetings, and other occasions.

See also
Sindhi cuisine
Sindhi biryani

References

External links

Sindhi cuisine
Pakistani cuisine
Indian rice dishes
Rice dishes
Pakistani meat dishes
Pakistani rice dishes